Christina Haswood (born April 17, 1994) is an American politician serving as a Democratic member of the Kansas House of Representatives from the 10th district. Haswood represents southeastern Douglas County, including Baldwin City and part of Lawrence.

Haswood is among the youngest members of the Kansas Legislature, as well as the third Native American member in the body's history.

Early life and education
Haswood is Navajo. She was named Miss Indian Youth of Lawrence as a teenager.

Haswood earned an associate's degree in Community Health at Haskell Indian Nations University before transferring to Arizona State University and earning a Bachelor's degree in public health in 2018. She graduated from the University of Kansas Medical Center with a Master's in Public Health in May 2020.

Career
Haswood announced her campaign for the Kansas House of Representatives from District 10 in May 2020. Her campaign quickly garnered support from prominent local, state, and national officials, including the retiring 10th District incumbent Eileen Horn, former Governor of Kansas Kathleen Sebelius, and New Mexico Congresswoman Deb Haaland.

During the primary, Haswood began posting videos to a campaign TikTok account about her life and activities, which gradually increased in attention. Due in part to small donations from across the country as a result, Haswood raised the most money of any candidate in the race.

On August 4, 2020, Haswood won the primary with 71% of the vote. No Republican candidate filed to contest the general election. Haswood was elected to the Kansas House unopposed on November 3, 2020.

Kansas House of Representatives
Haswood wore traditional Navajo attire during her swearing-in ceremony on January 11, 2021. Her TikTok videos of the ceremony received media coverage from BuzzFeed and Vogue. She serves on the Kansas Department of Health and Environment's Advisory Committee on Trauma.

2021–2022 committee membership
 Agriculture
 Health and Human Services
 Water
 Joint Committee on State-Tribal Relations

Elections

References

Democratic Party members of the Kansas House of Representatives
Politicians from Lawrence, Kansas
University of Kansas alumni
Arizona State University alumni
Haskell Indian Nations University alumni
Women state legislators in Kansas
21st-century American women politicians
21st-century American politicians
1994 births
Living people
Navajo people
21st-century Native American women
21st-century Native American politicians